Nikitinskaya is a rural locality (a village) in Tiginskoye Rural Settlement, Vozhegodsky District, Vologda Oblast, Russia. The population was 55 as of 2002.

Geography 
Nikitinskaya is located 19 km west of Vozhega (the district's administrative centre) by road. Leshchyovka is the nearest rural locality.

References 

Rural localities in Vozhegodsky District